Diuris sulphurea, commonly called the tiger orchid or hornet orchid, is a species of orchid which is endemic to eastern Australia. It has up to three leaves, and a flowering stem with up to seven bright yellow flowers with dark brown markings.

Description
The flowers are bright yellow with a few prominent dark brown markings. There is a ridge-shaped callus in the mid-line of the base of the labellum and extending about half way along. Flowering occurs from August to December.

Taxonomy and naming
Diuris sulphurea was first formally described in 1810 by Robert Brown and the description was published in Prodromus florae Novae Hollandiae.

Distribution and habitat
The tiger orchid occurs in all states of Australia except Western Australia and the Northern Territory. It grows in forest, woodland, heath, grassland and coastal scrub. In Victoria it often occurs with Diuris pardina and sometimes forms hybrids with that species.

References

Orchids of the Australian Capital Territory
Orchids of New South Wales
Orchids of Queensland
Orchids of South Australia
Orchids of Tasmania
Orchids of Victoria (Australia)
Endemic orchids of Australia
sulphurea
Plants described in 1810